Army Materiel Command, short "HMAK", was the Royal Danish Army's institution in all matters of material. That included supply, maintenance and production. Anything from tanks to the sunglasses of troops or which kind of chocolate is in the field rations. It was a Level. II command authority, directly under the Defence Command. Before the merger with the air force and navy materiel commands into the new unified Defense Materiel Service, FMT.

HMAK was until its end, the oldest institution of the military of Denmark and could trace its history back to 1602. It was run like a modern company, with depots and workshops located all over the country. It employed roughly 1100 people, with 700 of them located in Hjørring. The central authority was located in Hjørring, it has now been taken over by the Defense Materiel Command, as its headquarters.

History 
In 1596 it was thought that it would be a good idea to get an overview over all the war-material in the Kings inventory. So in 1597 the counting and collection in armouries began, primarily to locations in or around Copenhagen and the Kings castle.
In 1598 the construction of the main armoury was begun, called "Tøjhuskomplekset" (today this is known as "Tøjhusmuseet"). Tøjhuskomplekset was to be the main armoury for storage, maintenance and production of the Kings war-material, for both the Army and Navy.

Hans Kost was its first chief and he got his commission on August 18, 1602. This day is therefore counted as the origin of HMAK, which celebrated its 400 anniversary in August 2002. Tøjhuskomplekset was fully finished in 1604.

From 1615 the Artillery-corps handled the administration of the armies material needs. From 1675 the engineers-corps also took some part in this. This worked all the way to 1762, after which a lot of smaller more specified branches took administration of their respective areas.

In 1909 Army Technical Corps, short "HTK" was formed to take organizational command of some of all those administration areas. Still numerous departments, companies, regiments and corps to handle material came and went doing the next 60 years, some under HTK some independent.

HMAK was formed November 1, 1968, by combining Army Technical Corps, Engineer Technical Service, Army Signal Service, The Weapon Armoury, as well as some smaller areas of other troops, into one organization. The organization was a central authority with three assembling areas (Parkområder), named "Nordjyske Parkområde" (North Jutland Assembly Area), "Sydjyske Parkområde" (South Jutland Assembly Area) and "Sjællandske Parkområde" (Zealand Assembly Area).

November 1, 1971, the central authority relocated to Hjørring. In 1983 "Nordjyske Parkområde" and "Sydjyske Parkområde" were combined into "Jyske Parkområde" (Jutland assembling area).

In January 1991, HMAK was organized into "Army Supply Service" (Hærens Forsyningstjeneste), "Army Technical Service" (Hærens Tekniske Tjeneste), "Jutland assembling area" (Jyske Parkområde), "Zealand assembling area" (Sjællandske Parkområde) and "Munition Arsenal" (Ammunitionsarsenalet).

In 1997 "Jutland assembling area" and "Zealand assembling area" was combined into "Army assembling area" (Hærens Parkområde).

Subordinated Level. III authorities 
   Army Assembling Area (Hærens Parkområde - HPO)
  Zealand Assembling Area (Sjællandske Parkområde)
  Jutlandic Assembling Area (Jyske Parkområde)
  South Jutlandic Assembling Area (Sydjyske Parkområde)
  Army Head Workshop  (Hærens Hovedværksted - HHV)
 Munition Arsenal (Ammunitionsarsenalet - AMA)

References

Sources
 HMAK history Closed down
 new command authority active

Army units and formations of Denmark
Hjørring